This is a list of aviation-related events from 1922:

Events 
 The Persian Army forms an air department.
The Argentine Navy opens a naval aviation school.
Brazil studies the possibility of converting two merchant ships into aircraft carriers. Although nothing comes of the idea, it is the first time a Latin American country considers the acquisition of an aircraft carrier.
 The first commercial night flight between London and Paris takes place.
 The Imperial Japanese Navy attaches rigid airships to the Combined Fleet, and they begin to participate in the fleets exercises.
 During an exercise in Tokyo Bay, Imperial Japanese Navy aircraft drop torpedoes for the first time.
 The Spanish Navy commissions Dédalo, its only aviation ship until after the end of World War II and the only ship in history equipped to operate airships, balloons, and seaplanes.
 No. 60 Squadron RAF sees active service against rebel tribesmen in the Northwest Frontier Province of India.
 Henry Berliner founds the Berliner Aircraft Company in Alexandria, Pennsylvania.
 The Lewis & Vought Corporation is renamed the Chance Vought Corporation.
 Hermann Oberths submits his dissertation, which is rejected as "too fantastic". It will be published in 1923 as The Rocket to Planetary Spaces and will become a major work in spaceflight history.
The Società Aeronautica Italiana is founded by Angelo Ambrosini at Passignano sul Trasimeno, Italy.
 A factory fire forces English aircraft and motorcycle manufacturer Martinsyde into liquidation with surplus Buzzard airframes in stock.

January
 January 14 – The Handley Page O/10 G-EATN, operated by Handley Page Transport on a scheduled passenger flight from Croydon Airport in London, England, to Paris–Le Bourget Airport outside Paris, France, crashes while on approach to Paris–Le Bourget, killing all five people on board.

February 
 February 6 – The Washington Naval Conference concludes in Washington, D.C., with an agreement on the Five-Power Treaty (often referred to as the Washington Naval Treaty), which places limits on naval forces, including aircraft carriers. It limits the aircraft carrier forces of the United Kingdom and United States to 135,000 displacement tons each, of Japan to 81,000 tons, and of France and Italy to 60,000 tons each. The treaty will remain in force until December 31, 1936.

March 
 March 13 – Portuguese pilots Captain Gago Coutinho and Captain Sacadura Cabral leave Lisbon to attempt the first aerial crossing of the South Atlantic. They arrive in Brazil on June 16, in the third Fairey III they use for the trip.
 March 20 – The United States Navy commissions its first aircraft carrier, a converted collier.
 March 22 – A chartered seaplane from Miami to Bimini developed engine problems and ditched into the sea eight and a half miles from its destination. All five passengers as well as the pilot (and owner) of the seaplane survived the crash but the passengers subsequently drowned. Only the pilot survived, picked up by a passing tanker after 56 hours in the water.

April 
 April 4 – The Colombian Ministry of War opens a flying school, the Escuela de Aviación ("School of Aviation"), at Flandes.
 April 7 – 1922 Picardie mid-air collision: A Daimler Airway de Havilland DH.18 collides with a Compagnie des Grands Express Aériens Farman Goliath over France. All seven people aboard the two aircraft are killed in the first mid-air collision of two airliners.
 April 13 – While preparing for the first attempt in history to fly around the world, Royal Australian Air Force Captain Ross Smith and Lieutenant James Bennett die in the crash at Byfleet, Surrey, England, of a Vickers Viking amphibian aircraft they are testing for the proposed circumnavigation.
 April 16 – Secretly taking advantage of the Treaty of Rapallo with Bolshevik Russia and in violation of the Treaty of Versailles, Germany sets up a flying school for German pilots at Lipetsk in Russia. By 1933, 450 German military pilots will have trained there,

May 
 The Italian Corpo Aeronautico Militare ("Military Aviation Corps") holds experimental maneuvers in Friuli, Italy, to test the ability of military aircraft to coordinate troop movements on the ground by informing ground commanders of the movements of friendly and enemy ground forces. The experiment is less successful than hoped because of communication difficulties.
 The admirals′ committee of the Regia Marina (Italian Royal Navy) meets to discuss aviation generally and the use of airplanes in naval operations. Among the opinions expressed are that strikes by torpedo planes against ships at sea would be hampered by their need for support by reconnaissance and attack aircraft and the small amount of explosive in aerial torpedoes and would be no more dangerous that torpedo boat attacks and unlikely to achieve any success; that the Italian people would not want their defense to rely in a force "enclosed in such a fragile wrapping as today′s aircraft;" and that the airplane would take a long time to develop into a practical naval weapon and at present was "contrary to the ethical and aesthetic elements the Regia Marina was accustomed to demand in [its] preparation for war."
 May 1 – Deruluft (Deutsche-Russische Luftverkehrs, "German-Russian Airlines") commences operations.
 May 7 – As part of the ceremonies during the inaugural weekend of Stadium Jalapeño at Xalapa, Veracruz, Mexico, the American pilot Frank Hawks lands his Standard J-1 biplane on the field within the stadium.
 May 15 – Instone Air Line commences flights between Croydon Airport (London), Brussels and Cologne Butzweilerhof Airport.
 May 24 – The first attempt to fly around the world begins as British Army Major Wilfred T. Blake, Royal Air Force Captain Norman Macmillan, and British Army Lieutenant Colonel L. E. Broome depart Croydon, England, in the modified Airco DH.9 G-EBDE. They plan to fly to Calcutta, India, in the DH.9, then on to Vancouver, British Columbia, Canada, in a Fairey IIIC floatplane, then to Montreal, Quebec, Canada, in another DH.9, and finally from Montreal to Great Britain, covering  and completing the journey on September 7, 1922.
 May 31 – For the first time in history, skywriting is used for advertising purposes when Royal Air Force Captain Cyril Turner writes "Daily Mail" over the Derby at Epsom Downs Racecourse near Epsom, Surrey, England.

June 
 Flying an Avro Baby, a Russian pilot makes the first flight between London and Moscow.
 The first aircraft of the Irish Air Corps, a Martinsyde Buzzard Type A, arrives in Ireland at Baldonnel Aerodrome.
 June 16 – Henry Berliner demonstrates a primitive helicopter to the United States Army.
 June 17 – Jumping from a Finnish Air Force Grigorovich M-16, Eero Erho makes Finland′s first parachute jump.
 June 24 – Construction of the United States Navy rigid airship  begins at Naval Air Station Lakehurst, New Jersey.

July 
 The first Coast Guard Air Station, Coast Guard Air Station Morehead City at Morehead City, North Carolina, closes, leaving the United States Coast Guard without an air base until 1926.
 July 4 – A commercial LVG C.VI piloted by Lothar von Richthofen – a World War I ace with 40 victories and the younger brother of the top-scoring World War I ace Manfred von Richthofen – and carrying the American actress Fern Andra and her companion director Georg Bluen as passengers, suffers engine failure and crashes at Fuhlsbüttel, Germany. Von Richthofen and Bluen die; Andra spends a year recovering from her injuries.
 July 6 – The first use of naval aircraft in combat in Latin America takes place in Brazil during the first Tenente revolt when two Brazilian Navy aircraft bomb the rebellious Fort Copacabana in Rio de Janeiro.
 July 10 – The Aircraft Development Corporation is incorporated in Michigan in the United States. It later changes its name to Detroit Aircraft Corporation.
 July 16 – At Hampton Roads, Virginia, the United States Navys only balloon ship, the lighter-than-air craft tender USS Wright (AZ-1), flies her balloon for the last time. She soon is rebuilt as a seaplane tender (AV-1) with no balloon capability.

August 

 Britain's Air Ministry issues its first requirement for a purpose-designed night fighter. Specification 25/22 will eventually be filled by the Hawker Woodcock.
 The first national French glider meeting, the Congrės expérimental d'aviation sans moteur, organized by the Association of French Flyers and partly funded by the French government, takes place in Combegrasse, Puy-de-Dôme. 
August 7
The seventh annual Aerial Derby is held, sponsored by the Royal Aero Club. Ten participants fly over a 99-mile (159-kilometer) circuit beginning and ending at Croydon Airport in London with control points at Brooklands, Hertford, Epping, and West Thurrock; the aircraft fly the circuit twice.
The second annual Air League Challenge Cup race is held at Croydon Airport in London. Competitors race over a three-lap course in teams of three, with each team member physically passing a baton to the next team member after completing one lap. Two Royal Air Force teams – one representing the defending champions at RAF Kenley, the other representing RAF Uxbridge – are the only entrants. The race is cancelled when the second lap begins with the engine of RAF Kenley's Avro 504 refusing to start and RAF Uxbridge's Avro 504 crash-landing after suffering engine failure on takeoff, narrowly missing the crowd. One SE.5a from each RAF station continues with an informal, two-lap race, which RAF Uxbridge wins easily, but RAF Kenley retains the cup from 1921.
 August 10 – The 1922 Schneider Trophy race is flown at Naples, Italy.
August 15 – During a bombing show at Puck, Poland, an observer prematurely drops a bomb from a Lübeck-Travemünde F.4 floatplane. The bomb falls among spectators, killing 13 people and injuring 34.
 August 18 – Arthur Martens makes the first sailplane flight of over one hour during a glider competition at the Wasserkuppe in Germany, remaining aloft for 66 minutes. His aircraft, named Vampyr ("Vampire") is designed by Wolfgang Klemmperer.
 August 22 – Captain Norman Macmillan and cine-photographer Geoffrey Mallins are rescued from the Bay of Bengal when their civilianised Fairey IIIC floatplane suffers engine failure and capsizes after landing in the Indian Ocean at the beginning of the second leg of their attempt to make the first flight around the world. Major Wilfred T. Blake had already left the effort due to appendicitis, and Malin had replaced Lieutenant Colonel L. E. Broome. The two men are rescued from their overturned aircraft on August 24. They had taken 91 days reach Burma, and they are far behind schedule when their around-the-world attempt ends.

September 
 September 4 – United States Army Lieutenant Jimmy Doolittle flies across the United States in under a day in a de Havilland DH.4. He takes 21 hours 19 minutes to fly from Pablo Beach, Florida, to Rockwell Field, California.
 September 9 – Captain Frank L. Barnard wins the first King's Cup Race air race, flying from Croydon Aerodrome (London) to Glasgow (Scotland) and back in 6 hours 32 minutes in an Airco DH.4A.
 September 27 – The United States Navy conducts the first large-scale torpedo bombing exercises. Eighteen Naval Aircraft Factory PTs attack three battleships and score eight hits in 25 minutes.

October 
 Under the terms of the secret Treaty of Rapallo with Bolshevik Russia and in a violation of the Treaty of Versailles, the German Junkers company secretly establishes an aircraft factory at Fili in the Soviet Union.
 October 6 – United States Army Air Service Lieutenants John A. Macready and Oakley G. Kelly set a flight endurance record of 35 hours 18 minutes in a Fokker T-2.
 October 8 – Lilian Gatlin arrives at Curtiss Field, Long Island, New York, becoming the first woman to cross the continental United States by airplane. She completes the 2,680-mile (4,316-km) flight in 27 hours 11 minutes. The flight is intended to promote the National Association of Aviation Gold Mothers, an organization she founded, and to encourage the United States Government to begin an annual commemoration of aviators who have given their lives "on the altar of patriotism and progress in pursuit of an ideal."
 October 14 – The prototype of the Latécoère 4 crashes in France after being caught in a gust of wind, injuring both men on board. No further examples of the aircraft are built.
 October 16–21 – The Daily Mail sponsors a glider competition at Itford Hill in the South Downs east of Brighton, England, attracting 13 competitors. Alexis Manyrol of France wins with a world-record 201-minute flight in his Peyret tandem monoplane glider; the best British performance is by Fred Raynham, who remains aloft for 113 minutes in his Handasyde glider.
 October 20 – United States Army Air Service Lieutenant Harold Harris makes the first parachute escape from a stricken aircraft, bailing out of a Loening PW-2 over Dayton, Ohio.
 October 22 – Flying a bright yellow Kinner Airster named The Canary, Amelia Earhart sets a new women's altitude record, reaching .
 October 26 – United States Navy Lieutenant Commander Godfrey Chevalier makes the first landing on the aircraft carrier , flying an Aeromarine 39.

November 
 The seventh Salon d'Aéronautique is held in Paris.
 Ras Haile Selassie, the future Emperor of Ethiopia, witnesses an air show by the British Royal Air Force in Aden, seeing airplanes for the first time and becoming the first Ethiopian to ride in one. He becomes an advocate for the creation of an Imperial Ethiopian Air Force, which will be founded in August 1929.
 November 2 – Qantas begins its first scheduled flights, between Charleville, Queensland and Cloncurry, Queensland.
 November 8 – The United States Army Air Service′s Air Service Field Officers School at Langley Field, Virginia – predecessor of the Air Corps Tactical School – is renamed the Air Service Tactical School.
 November 12 – Japan's first airmail service commences, linking Sakai, Osaka, and Tokushima.
 November 18 – The first use of an aircraft catapult to launch a plane from an aircraft carrier takes place, when the U.S. Navy carrier  launches a Naval Aircraft Factory PT piloted by Commander Kenneth Whiting.
 November 19 – Malert (Magyar Legiforgalmi), a forerunner of MALÉV Hungarian Airlines, is formed.
 November 28 – The first use of skywriting for advertising in the United States takes place over New York City during a visit by British skywriting pilots Jack Savage and Cyril Turner.

December 
 The United States Navys first aircraft carrier, embarks her first standard air complement, Fighter Squadron 1 (VF-1), equipped with Naval Aircraft Factory/Curtiss TS-1 fighters.
 December 27 – Hōshō, Japan's first aircraft carrier, is commissioned. She is the worlds first aircraft carrier designed and built as such to be commissioned.
 December 31 – A Deutsche Luft-Reederei Dornier Komet becomes the first German aircraft to fly over the United Kingdom since the end of World War I.

First flights 
Blackburn Blackburn
Levasseur-Abrial A-1
Potez X
 Thomas-Morse MB-9

January 
 January 3 – Aero A.10
 January 12 – Mitsubishi 2MR

February 
 Latécoère 8

March 
 Breguet 19
 Loening PA-1
 March 26 – de Havilland DH.34

June 
 de Havilland DH.37
 June 8 – Bellanca CF

July 
 Bristol Racer
 July 14 – Junkers T 19

August 
 Mitsubishi 1MT
 August 22
Aeromarine PG-1
Vickers Victoria
 August 31 – J-1, first U.S. Navy J-class blimp

September 
 September 27 – Curtiss R-6
 September 29 – Thomas-Morse R-5, also known as the Thomas-Morse TM-22

October 
 October 11 – Navy-Wright NW Mystery Racer
 October 13 – Curtiss R-6

November 
 Levasseur PL.2
 November 6 – Dornier Do J
 November 18 – Dewoitine D.1
 November 24 – Vickers Virginia
 November 28 – Fairey Flycatcher

December 

 December 5 – Potez XVIII
 December 11 – Potez XI

Entered service 
 Avro 555 Bison with No. 3 Squadron, Royal Air Force
 Nieuport-Delage NiD.29 
 Vickers Vernon with the Royal Air Force

Retirements 
 August – Westland Wagtail by the Royal Air Force

Notes

References 
 Taylor, H.A. Fairey Aircraft since 1915. London:Putnam, 1988. .

 
Aviation
Aviation by year